Hyposulfite may refer to:
The thiosulfate anion
Sodium thiosulfate, a salt containing the thiosulfate anion
, a reported sulfur oxyanion.
Dithionite as in sodium dithionite.

References

Sulfur oxyanions